The 2011 International GT Open season was the sixth season of the International GT Open, the grand tourer-style sports car racing founded in 2006 by the Spanish GT Sport Organización. It began on 30 April at Autodromo Enzo e Dino Ferrari and finished on 30 October, at Circuit de Catalunya after eight double-header meetings.

The season was won by JMB Racing driver Soheil Ayari, who raced on the Ferrari F458 GT2. He also won the Super GT standings. Lorenzo Bontempelli
and Stefano Gattuso, who raced behind the wheel of Kessel Racing's Ferrari 430 GT3 Scuderia won the GTS class.

Race calendar and results
 The series' provisional calendar was announced on 12 December 2010, with the Nürburgring meeting later replaced by a meeting in Portimão in January 2011.

Standings

Drivers

Super GT

Teams

Super GT

References

 2011 International GT Open final standings

External links
Official website

International GT Open
International GT Open seasons